Xu Huizi (9 December 1932 – 5 January 2005) was a general in the People's Liberation Army of China who served as president of the PLA Military Sciences Academy from 1995 to 1997.

He was a member of the 12th, 13th and 14th Central Committee of the Chinese Communist Party. He was a member of the Standing Committee of the 9th National People's Congress.

Biography
Xu was born in Penglai County (now Penglai District of Yantai), Shandong, on 9 December 1932. He was a soldier of the Republic of China Armed Forces before being captured by the Fourth Field Army during the Liaoshen campaign. He was conscripted into the People's Liberation Army (PLA) in 1948, and joined the Chinese Communist Party (CCP) in 1950.

After founding of the Communist State, in 1950, he participated in the Korean War. In 1985, he was promoted to deputy chief of the People's Liberation Army General Staff Department, he remained in that position until July 1995, when he was appointed president of the PLA Military Sciences Academy.

He was promoted to the rank of lieutenant general (zhongjiang) in 1988 and general (shangjiang) in 1994. 

On 5 January 2005, he died from an illness in Beijing, at the age of 72.

References

1932 births
2005 deaths
People from Yantai
People's Liberation Army generals from Shandong
People's Republic of China politicians from Shandong
Chinese Communist Party politicians from Shandong
Members of the 12th Central Committee of the Chinese Communist Party
Members of the 13th Central Committee of the Chinese Communist Party
Members of the 14th Central Committee of the Chinese Communist Party
Members of the Standing Committee of the 9th National People's Congress